Bofa erlangeri, also known commonly as the Ethiopian house snake, is a species of snake in the family Lamprophiidae. The species is endemic to Ethiopia.

Taxonomy
B. erlangeri is the only species in the genus Bofa.

Etymology
The specific name, erlangeri, is in honor of German ornithologist Carlo von Erlanger, who was one of the collectors of the holotype.

Geographic range
B. erlangeri is found in the central plateau of Ethiopia.

Habitat

Description

Diet
B. erlangeri preys upon rodents.

Reproduction
B. erlangeri is oviparous.

References

Further reading
Largen MJ, Spawls S (2010). Amphibians and Reptiles of Ethiopia and Eritrea. Frankfurt am Main: Edition Chimaira / Serpents Tale. 694 pp. . (Lamprophis erlangeri, p. 467).
Nečas P (1997). "Five endemic montane snakes from Ethiopia". Reptile & Amphibian Magazine 49: 58–65. (Lamprophis erlangeri, new combination).
Sternfeld R (1908). "Neue und ungenügend bekannte afrikanische Schlangen ". Sitzungsberichte der Gesellschaft Naturforschender Freunde zu Berlin 4: 92–95. (Boodon erlangeri, new species, p. 92). (in German).
Tiutenko A, Koch C, Pabijan M, Zinenko O (2022). "Generic affinities of African house snakes revised: a new genus for Boodon erlangeri (Serpentes: Elapoidea: Lamprophiidae: Lamprophiinae)". Salamandra 58 (4): 235–262. (Bofa, new genus, p. 240; Bofa erlangeri, new combination, p. 241).
Wallach V, Williams KL, Boundy J (2014). Snakes of the World: A Catalogue of Living and Extinct Species. Boca Raton, London, New York: CRC Press, an Imprint of the Taylor & Francis Group. 1,237 pp. . (Boaedon erlangeri, p. 95).

Lamprophiidae
Snakes of Africa
Reptiles of Ethiopia
Endemic fauna of Ethiopia
Reptiles described in 1908
Taxa named by Richard Sternfeld